Fred Owusu Sekyere (born March 31, 1986) is a Ghanaian footballer who plays as a midfielder. He currently serves as Director of Technical Training and Camps at the Richmond Kickers Youth Club.

Career

College and amateur
Sekyere played four years of college soccer at Virginia Commonwealth University between 2006 and 2009.

Professional career
Sekyere played with NPSL club RVA FC in 2013 before signing with USL Pro club Charlotte Eagles in March 2014.

Sekyere signed with Richmond Kickers on 19 January 2015.

References

External links

 
 Fred Sekyere at Richmond Kickers

1986 births
Living people
Ghanaian footballers
Ghanaian expatriate footballers
VCU Rams men's soccer players
Charlotte Eagles players
Richmond Kickers players
Association football midfielders
Expatriate soccer players in the United States
USL Championship players